Cole McDonald (born May 20, 1998) is an American football quarterback for the Houston Roughnecks of the XFL. He most recently played for the Toronto Argonauts of the Canadian Football League (CFL). He played college football at Hawaii and was drafted by the Tennessee Titans in the seventh round of the 2020 NFL Draft.

Early life and high school
McDonald was born in La Mirada, California and grew up in La Habra, California. He attended Sonora High School where he played football and ran track. As a senior, McDonald completed 63% of his passes for 2,313 yards and 19 touchdowns while also rushing for 1,091 yards and 10 touchdowns. McDonald was lightly recruited in high school and initially received no scholarship offers from Division I schools. He initially intended on playing at a junior college for a year until he received a last-minute offer from Hawaii coach Nick Rolovich the night before national signing day.

College career
McDonald redshirted his true freshman season. As a redshirt freshman, McDonald served as the Rainbow Warriors's backup quarterback and played in six games, completing five of nine passes for 22 yards and a touchdown and finishing third on the team in rushing with 138 and one touchdown on 16 carries. He was named the team's starting quarterback going into his redshirt sophomore season and passed for 3,875 yards and 36 touchdowns and was named honorable mention All-Mountain West Conference (MWC). He tightened his motion after consulting quarterbacks coach Craig Stutzmann and completed 38 percent of his deep throws. Following the end of the season McDonald revealed that he had played through a sprained MCL and internal bleeding.

As a redshirt junior, McDonald passed for 4,135 and 33 touchdowns with 14 interceptions while also rushing for 383 yards and seven touchdowns and was named second-team All-MWC. Following the end of the season, he announced that he would forgo his final year of NCAA eligibility to enter the 2020 NFL Draft.

College statistics

Professional career

McDonald received an invitation to the NFL Scouting Combine and recorded the fastest 40-yard dash among quarterbacks with a time of 4.58 seconds and the highest vertical jump at 36 inches.

Tennessee Titans
McDonald was drafted by the Tennessee Titans in the seventh round with the 224th overall pick of the 2020 NFL Draft. He was waived by the Titans on August 19, 2020.

McDonald had a tryout with the Carolina Panthers on August 23, 2020.

Arizona Cardinals
McDonald was signed to a futures contract with the Arizona Cardinals on February 4, 2021. He was waived on May 27, 2021.

Toronto Argonauts
On September 13, 2021, McDonald signed with the Toronto Argonauts and was placed on the team's practice roster. He dressed as a backup for the last regular season game with the Argonauts resting starters for the playoffs.  He completed four out of eight pass attempts for 45 yards and one interception. He was released on May 25, 2022, in the early stages of 2022 training camp.

Houston Roughnecks 
On November 15, 2022, McDonald was assigned to the Houston Roughnecks of the XFL.

References

External links

Toronto Argonauts bio
Hawaii Rainbow Warriors bio
Tennessee Titans bio

1998 births
Living people
Sportspeople from Orange County, California
People from La Habra, California
Players of American football from California
American football quarterbacks
Hawaii Rainbow Warriors football players
Tennessee Titans players
The Spring League players
Arizona Cardinals players
Toronto Argonauts players
Houston Roughnecks players